The North Wales Fire and Rescue Service (NWFRS) is the fire and rescue service covering the principal areas of Anglesey, Conwy, Denbighshire, Flintshire, Gwynedd and Wrexham in the north of Wales. With service coverage in north-west Wales being predominantly rural. The NWFRS is headquartered in St Asaph, Denbighshire, Wales.

The service was created in 1996 by the Local Government (Wales) Act 1994 which reformed Welsh local government, by a merger of the previous Clwyd and Gwynedd fire services. The Service employs over 1000 staff in operational and support roles.

The fire authority which administers the service is a joint board made up of councillors from Anglesey, Conwy, Denbighshire, Flintshire, Gwynedd and Wrexham councils.

Fire stations  
The fire and rescue service operates three duty crewing systems: they are wholetime, day-crewed and an “on-call” retained duty system. Wholetime fire appliances are crewed twenty-four hours a day, seven days a week. Day-crewed appliances are crewed by wholetime firefighters based at the fire station between 12pm and 10pm. The same firefighters then provide cover from home outside of these hours as retained firefighters. Retained firefighters are summoned to the fire station by pager from home or work to respond to emergency calls. Cross-crewing is a cost-cutting measure that sees various fire appliances being crewed by a single crew. This means, for example, if an appliance in the cross-crewing system responds to an incident, any other appliances in the system will be unavailable as they will have no crew.

See also 
 List of British firefighters killed in the line of duty
 North Wales Police

References

External links
 

Fire and rescue services of Wales
Gwynedd
Conwy County Borough
Denbighshire
Anglesey
Flintshire
Wrexham County Borough
1996 establishments in Wales
Organizations established in 1996